Benjamin Robert Duff (16 October 1867 – 25 June 1943) was a South African rugby union international. He also played a first-class cricket match with Western Province.

Personal
Duff, born in Swellendam, had a brother Colin who represented Rhodesia at cricket and rugby. He married Isabel Watkinson.

Cricket career
Duff's cricket match was against Natal during the 1889/90 South African cricket season. Although he batted with the tail, at number 10 in both innings, Duff wasn't called on to bowl once in the match. He scored one and eight not out, dismissed by Test player Gus Kempis in the first dig. Western Province's wicket-keeper for this game, Alfred Richards, was also a rugby union international and the duo appeared together in a Test with the South African national rugby union team.

Rugby union career
In 1891, Duff played three rugby union Test matches in a home series against the British Isles. These were the first ever official Tests that South Africa played and due to the order in which players' names were listed on team sheets for a match at the time, Duff has the distinction of being the first Springbok. He played his games as a full-back and represented Western Province at provincial rugby.

Test history

See also
List of South Africa national rugby union players – Springbok no. 1

References

External links
Cricinfo: Benjamin Duff
Scrum.com profile of Ben Duff

1867 births
1943 deaths
People from Swellendam
South African cricketers
Western Province cricketers
South African rugby union players
South Africa international rugby union players
Rugby union fullbacks
Western Province (rugby union) players
Hamilton RFC, Sea Point players
Alumni of South African College Schools
Rugby union players from the Western Cape